Shahriar (also Romanized as Shahriyār, Shahreyār, and Shahriār; also known as ‘Alī Shāh ‘Avaẕ and Ali Shāh ‘Iwaz) is a city in the Central District of Shahriar County, Tehran province, Iran, and serves as capital of the county. At the 2006 census, its population was 189,120 in 24,039 households. The following census in 2011 counted 249,473 people in 75,014 households. The latest census in 2016 showed a population of 309,607 people in 97,570 households.

History
The Municipality of Shahriar was established in 1953, in which the population of the city was 5,000. 

On 8 January 2020, Ukraine International Airlines Flight 752 was accidentally shot down near the city, killing all 176 people on board.

Transportation

The city is served by buses from the municipal-run Shahriar Municipality and Suburbs Bus Organization, connecting the city to Tehran and Karaj, while also serving a group of smaller surrounding towns.

References 

Shahriar County

Cities in Tehran Province

Populated places in Tehran Province

Populated places in Shahriar County